Minuscule 594 (in the Gregory-Aland numbering), ε 1402 (von Soden), is a Greek minuscule manuscript of the New Testament, on parchment. Palaeographically it has been assigned to the 14th century. The manuscript is lacunose. It was labelled by Scrivener as 470.

Description 

The codex contains the text of the four Gospels on 241 parchment leaves (size ) with lacunae. It is written in one column per page, 17 lines per page.

Contents: Matthew 1:1-Luke 23:15; 23:33-48.

Text 

The Greek text of the codex is a representative of the Byzantine text-type. Hermann von Soden classified it to the textual family Kr. Aland placed it in Category V. According to Wisse's Profile Method it represents the textual family Kr in Luke 1 and Luke 20. In Luke 10 no profile was made, Luke 1 is partly illegible.

History 

The manuscript was added to the list of New Testament manuscripts by F. H. A. Scrivener. It was examined by Dean Burgon.

The manuscript currently is housed at the Biblioteca di S. Lazzaro (1531), at Venice.

See also 

 List of New Testament minuscules
 Biblical manuscript
 Textual criticism

References

Further reading 

 

Greek New Testament minuscules
14th-century biblical manuscripts